The Presbyterian Church in Korea (DokNoHoe) has its roots in the north. Pastors created an independent Presbytery in the North Korea area. It was joined about 30 churches. During the Korean war many members fled to South. They also established themselves in Seoul and founded the Sangjunghyung Church in 1954. In 1967 they organised as a presbytery, during this period several splits occurred. In 1974 the General Assembly was organised. It adheres to the Apostles Creed and the Westminster Confession. The DokNoHoe has 15,000 members and 87 congregations.

References 

Presbyterian denominations in Asia
Presbyterian denominations in South Korea